The Specialist, Organised & Economic Crime Command is a unit within the Gangs and Organised Crime group of Specialist Crime & Operations within London's Metropolitan Police Service. The unit's main responsibility is to both investigate and take steps to prevent fraud, along with a wide range of other fraudulent crimes which require specialist knowledge and training to investigate. The unit was previously known as the Fraud Squad, or by its previous Specialist Operations designation, SO6.

History
Formed in 1946, the unit was originally known as Metropolitan and City Police Fraud Department or "C6 Branch". It was the first integrated cross-border, co-operative unit set up jointly between London's two police services; the City of London Police due to their expertise in business and stock market fraud, and the Metropolitan Police with their investigative experience.

The increasing complexity of business fraud as time progressed, and hence the lessened chances of securing a successful prosecution, saw the implementation of the Serious Fraud Office in 1987. Due to the Serious Fraud Office making C6 obsolete, the City of London Police and the Metropolitan Police reverted to having their own Fraud Squads. The MPS' was then called SO6. Staffed by about 140 detectives, specialised teams within the Squad included the Commercial Crimes Intelligence Bureau, a Financial Investigations Unit, the Fraud Prevention Office, a Surveillance Unit, a Crime Management Unit and a fledgling Computer Crime Unit.

In October 2000, the Fraud Squad was renamed Economic and Specialist Crime as part of the Specialist Crime Directorate, and its remit was expanded substantially to cover a wider range of financial and economic crime and fraud. Several other autonomous units, such as the Arts and Antiquities Squad, were merged with the new unit.
The Proactive Money Laundering Investigation Team, formed in 2003, has a remit to deal with high-level money laundering, and also are active in removing substantial amounts of criminal cash from the organised criminal networks working in and around London.

Structure
The Specialist, Organised & Economic Crime Command is made up of several teams and sub-units:
 Art and Antiques Unit
 The Branch Intelligence Unit
 The Criminal Finance Team (CFT)
 The Dedicated Cheque and Plastic Crime Unit
 The Extradition and International Assistance Units
 The Financial Investigation Development Unit
 The Flying Squad
 The Fraud Squads
 Project Genesius
 The Kidnap Unit
 The London Regional Asset Recovery Team (London RART)
 Operation Maxim
 Middle Market Drugs Partnership
 Operation Nexus
 The Police Central e-crime Unit (PCeU)
 The Proactive Money Laundering Taskforce (PMLT)
 The Projects Team
 Operation Sterling
 The Stolen Vehicle Unit (SVU)
 The Trafficking and Prostitution Unit
 The Special Intelligence Section (SIS)

See also
 Serious Organised Crime Agency
 Specialist Crime Directorate

References

Metropolitan Police units
Financial crime prevention